Martín Quispe Julián (born 10 June 1959) is a Bolivian educator, politician, and trade unionist who served as a member of the Chamber of Deputies from La Paz, representing circumscription 21 from 2010 to 2015.

Born in the Calamarca Municipality, Quispe spent his early career as a schoolteacher before pivoting to broadcast radio. Around 1996, he returned to his home Aroma Province, where he held positions of leadership within both his indigenous community in the area's trade unions.

A member of the Movement for Socialism, Quispe served within the party's provincial and departmental affiliates until 2009, when he was elected to the Chamber of Deputies. Quispe's ninety percent victory was the highest margin achieved by any candidate running in single-member constituencies that cycle. He was not nominated for reelection.

Early life and career 
Martín Quispe was born on 10 June 1959 in Calamarca, a rural municipality in the Aroma Province of southern La Paz; the son of Justino Quispe and Emeteria Julián. As a young adult, Quispe initially pursued a career in education, attending the Warisata Normal School, where he graduated as a professor. After a few short stints spent teaching at the Agua Rica and later Bella Vista schools throughout the mid to late 1980s, Quispe retired from that profession. He returned to school and got an education in communication sciences, spending the next few years working in AM and FM radio. 

In the mid-1990s, Quispe resettled in Calamarca, where he assumed positions of traditional leadership within his home canton of Cosmini, including serving as the area's mallku in 1996. That same year, he began participating in the area's trade syndicates, serving as general secretary of his local farmers' union before being elected to lead Calamarca's workers' center the following year.

Chamber of Deputies

Election 

An early adherent of the Movement for Socialism (MAS-IPSP), Quispe first joined the party's Cosmini affiliate in 1998. The MAS nominated him as its Calamarca mayoral candidate the following year, but he took home just thirty-two votes. In subsequent years, Quispe remained off the ballot but continued to progressively rise through the ranks of the MAS's internal structure. In 2002, he was made a member of the party's provincial transparency committee, and in 2007, he became its departmental secretary of international relations, the third highest-ranking position within the MAS's La Paz affiliate.

In 2009, ten years after his 1999 loss, Quispe was nominated for a seat in the Chamber of Deputies. He campaigned in southern La Paz's circumscription 21, encompassing his home Aroma Province, as well the neighboring Loayza and Villarroel provinces. Quispe won by a landslide, attaining ninety percent of the popular vote, the highest margin for any candidate running in single-member constituencies that cycle. In a race where the second-place candidate won less than five percent of the vote, Quispe's only contender was the plethora of spoilt ballots, which, when included, drop his margin to 68.2 percent. According to sociologist Salvador Romero, the high propensity of abstentions responded to a "certain indifference on the part of the electorate towards candidates who are expected to win, and of whom little is known."

Tenure 
Quispe's parliamentary tenure was split between two committees; he spent the first three years of his term on the lower chamber's Environment Committee, later switching to the Social Welfare Committee in his closing two years. In these positions, Quispe's work focused on tackling mental health; he drafted a bill in the Chamber of Deputies on the subject and presented a similar proposal to the Latin American Parliament in his capacity as a delegate to it. Outside of legislation, Quispe's tenure was marked by scandal over allegations that he used his influence to procure the release from prison of Yesid Luín, the mayor of Calamarca. Luín had been arrested in 2011 after being caught smuggling cocaine in his car. His subsequent release and restoration to the position of mayor was controversial, with a lengthy criminal process against himself, Quispe, and others going on into 2015 and beyond.

Commission assignments 
 Social Policy Commission
 Social Welfare and Protection Committee (2013–2015)
 Amazon Region, Land, Territory, Water, Natural Resources, and Environment Commission
 Environment, Climate Change, Protected Areas, and Forest Resources Committee (2010–2013)

Electoral history

References

Notes

Footnotes

Bibliography

External links 

 Deputies profile Vice Presidency .

1959 births
Living people
21st-century Bolivian politicians
Aymara politicians
Bolivian educators
Bolivian people of Aymara descent
Bolivian politicians of indigenous peoples descent
Bolivian radio people
Bolivian trade union leaders
Members of the Bolivian Chamber of Deputies from La Paz
Movement for Socialism (Bolivia) politicians
People from Aroma Province